Tilursar-e Sharqi (also Romanized as Tīlūrsar-e Sharqī; also known as Tīlūr) is a village in Kelarabad Rural District, Kelarabad District, Abbasabad County, Mazandaran Province, Iran. At the 2006 census, its population was 512, in 156 families.

References 

Populated places in Abbasabad County